Elroy Powell, better known by his stage name Spoonface (born 28 August 1973), is a British singer, songwriter, and producer. He is known as a member of the music group Black Legend.

Career
Spoonface achieved international recording success with the Black Legend cover of Barry White's song  "You See the Trouble with Me".  This proved to be a hit single reaching No. 1 in the UK Singles Chart, selling several million worldwide. He has collaborated with a number of artists from varying genres to include Deekline, High Contrast, Omar Lye-Fook, Janet Kay, Kelis, Craig David, Daniel Merriweather and the Sugababes.

He has also made screen appearances as Biggy Spect in the BBC series Trexx and Flipside, plus numerous bouts of presenter activity with Trouble TV’s interactive game show, Freakin Famous. He was a regular face on the BBC TV soap opera EastEnders and appeared in Star Wars Episode VII as Rosser Weno.

Recent engagements include Fighting With My Family, Pirates, Jingle Jangle and the Harry Enfield 100 years of BBC special.

Spoon has also worked extensively in the area of video games and recently won the One Voice Conference award for Best Male Voice in Gaming, with his performance in Techland's Dying Light 2 Stay Human as one of the main characters. Spoon voices the major character Jack Matt who is the leader of a rebellious army faction called the Peacekeepers. In story mode, players of Dying Light 2 can uncover more about his character and involvement in certain pivotal aspects of the game's plot. Spoon has also voiced the character of Magnus in the Dota 2 card game Artifact as well as a number of other roles in the video game industry.

References

External links 
Spoonface
Elroy Powell

1973 births
Living people
British male singer-songwriters
People from Sunderland
Musicians from Tyne and Wear
21st-century Black British male singers
English people of West Indian descent
Place of birth missing (living people)